Anaelys Fernández (born December 15, 1979) is a retired discus thrower from Cuba. Her personal best throw is 62.09 metres, achieved on June 13, 2003 in Havana.

Biography
She finished in sixth place at the 1998 World Junior Championships in Athletics in Annecy, France. She won the discus throw bronze medal at the 1999 Pan American Games and improved to take the silver medal at the 2003 edition. She is a two-time Cuban champion in the event, having won in 1999 and 2003.

Achievements

References

External links
Profile

1979 births
Living people
Cuban female discus throwers
Athletes (track and field) at the 1999 Pan American Games
Athletes (track and field) at the 2003 Pan American Games
Pan American Games medalists in athletics (track and field)
Pan American Games silver medalists for Cuba
Pan American Games bronze medalists for Cuba
Medalists at the 2003 Pan American Games
20th-century Cuban women
20th-century Cuban people
21st-century Cuban women